The Sumathi Best Television Audio Visual Award is presented annually in Sri Lanka by the Sumathi Group for the best Sri Lankan television audio visual.

The award was first given in 2011. The award was given to the three best AV media in each year. However, the award did not presented since 2015. Following is a list of the winners since then.

References

Awards established in 2011
2011 establishments in Sri Lanka